The Toshiba e310 was a personal digital assistant manufactured by Toshiba and first released in  2002. It ran Windows Pocket PC 2000 and featured a color 240x320 pixel touch-screen LCD, a 206MHz CPU, and 32MB of RAM. It was also equipped with a Secure Digital card slot, allowing for the expansion of internal memory and a Lithium-ion battery. A software upgrade was issued by Toshiba in 2003.

It was particularly small, thin and light at 12.45 x 7.87 x 1.19cm and 142g.

References

External links
Toshiba Pocket PC e310 Support Toshiba

Toshiba brands
Products introduced in 2002